Cubiceps caeruleus, the blue fathead or cubehead, is a species of driftfish native to the Pacific and Atlantic oceans. It mostly feeds on salps. This species can reach a length of  TL.

References

Nomeidae
Fish described in 1914